Tânia Tomé (born Tania Teresa Tomé on November 11, 1981, in Maputo, Mozambique) is a public speaker, entrepreneur, author, life coach, economist, TV personality, poet, and lyricist.

Biography 
Tânia Tomé is a motivational speaker who advocates for positive social change, entrepreneurship, and a leadership ecosystem. She is an executive, leadership, and transformational coach delivering sessions to multinational, big companies, and organizations in many countries with her company Ecokaya. She developed a coaching concept called Succenergy that lead her to a TEDx stage. She also volunteered to work for the NGO Education for Development as President, a community program with the support of President Barack Obama's PEPFAR Funds. She is the President of the Womenice Foundation, a project created to empower Women & Youth, entrepreneurship, leadership and SDG projects. In 2018 she was named by MIPAD (Most Influential People under African Descent) in New York, 100 most influential people in the world, of African descent, under 40. She holds an Economic Degree and Pos-graduation in Management and the Auditory.

References

1981 births
Mozambican businesspeople
Mozambican writers
Women business executives
Living people
Life coaches
Personal finance education